The Giants Despair Hillclimb is a hillclimb which was established in 1906 in Laurel Run, Luzerne County, Pennsylvania, United States, just southeast of its border to Wilkes-Barre Township. The contest was first run in conjunction with Wilkes-Barre's centennial celebration. It is the oldest continuing motorsport event in Pennsylvania.

History and race features
Race drivers from across the nation gather annually on East Northampton Street, a road that winds its way through a  section of Pennsylvania's steep mountains. Rising , the course reaches grades up to 20% and has six turns—including the 110 degree "Devil's Elbow"— on the way to the top. 

The initial race was won in 2 minutes 11.2 seconds.

During its first years, the race was used as a proving ground by the biggest names in the automotive industry. Louis Chevrolet raced the hill in 1909 driving for Buick. He won Event No. 2, Gasoline stock cars, selling from $851 to $1,250 in a time of 2:34.4 sec, his car being the only entry in the class. He is chiefly remembered for an accident: "A Buick with Louis Chevrolet driving, turned turtle on the course and narrowly missed a group of people. Chevrolet was not badly injured."

Bill Milliken drove the AJB/FWD Butterball Special, #111, in 1955 finishing third overall in a time of 63.771 sec.

Carroll Shelby,  Roger Penske, and Oscar Koveleski are just a few of the famous drivers that set out to tackle the mile.  The hill has been paved many times and the records have been shattered.  The current record holder is John Burke, who ran the course in 38.024 seconds in 2014. Today, the Hillclimb is run on the second weekend of July and is organized by the Pennsylvania Hillclimb Association (PHA).

Giants Despair events and past winners 

Key: R = Course Record.

See also 
 Hillclimbing in the USA
 Mount Washington Hillclimb Auto Race
 Sports Car Club of America

References

External links 
 Giant’s Despair. pahillclimb.org. Pennsylvania Hillclimb Association.
 Course Map of the Giants Despair Hillclimb at Laurel Run, PA from the website of the Pennsylvania Hillclimb Association (PHA).
 Giants Despair Hill Climb. Description archived from the website of the Delaware & Lehigh National Heritage Corridor (D&L).
 Giant's Despair Records (PDF). Archived from the original on hilltiming.com on 2015-05-28.
 Gibbons, Geri. "No ‘Despair,’ only fun competition, on first day of Hill Climb". 8 July 2017. Times Leader. Civitas Media.
 Giant's Despair Hillclimb 2015 Stats. Archived from the original on hilltiming.com on 2016-04-25.
 Shurmaitis, Dawn. "Giants Despair race supercharges local economy : 102-year-old hillclimb draws thousands each year, along with their spending money." 4 July 2008. Archived from The Times Leader.
 Laurel Run counts on hill climb. 7/8/2013. Times Leader. Civitas Media.
 Lynott, Jerry. "Giants Despair Hill Climb draws enthusiastic crowd". 11 July 2015. Times Leader. Civitas Media.
 Pennsylvania Hillclimb Association Museum & Archives.

Hillclimbs
Auto races in the United States
Motorsport in Pennsylvania
Tourist attractions in Luzerne County, Pennsylvania
1906 establishments in Pennsylvania